Gandhi Khan is an album by the American electronic musician Armand Van Helden, released on June 14, 2002. The album contains the song "Why Can't U Free Some Time" which reached #34 in the UK Singles Chart.

Track listing
 "Karma Knowledge" – 0:13
 "Gandhi Khan" – 4:32
 "I Can Smell U" – 7:27
 "Mongoloid Sessions" – 0:43
 "Why Can't U Free Some Time" – 7:37
 "Don Chiconelli Pt. 1" – 0:57
 "The Robots Are Cumming" – 6:35
 "Kentucky Fried Flow" – 6:35
 "Oxtail And Curried Goat" – 0:29
 "Doovoodoo" – 4:24
 "Don Chiconelli Pt. 2" – 0:21
 "(Girl) You Got Me" – 5:09
 "Scarface Wiggle" – 0:18
 "Chocolate Covered Cherry" – 7:09
 "The Great Serpent God" – 0:21
 "Heed The White Seed" – 5:15
 "Flyaway Love Pt. 2" – 8:37
 "Good Whoman Being" – 1:02

Release history

References

2001 albums
Armand Van Helden albums